The narrow gauge railway at Camp A. A. Humphreys was a  long  gauge military railway at what is now Fort Belvoir, Virginia .

History 
In 1918, the AA Humphreys camp was set-up in Fort Belvoir, Virginia. It was named after Brigadier General Andrew Atkinson Humphreys, who served during the civil war in the Union Army and later as the Chief of the engineers of the army before he died in 1883. It was an important training camp for pioneers and other soldiers who learned to build roads, railroads, bridges and trenches.
 
 
 
The light rails of a narrow-gauge railway could be laid quickly and, if necessary, quickly dismantled. Because of the small gauge, smaller radii could be used than with standard gauge railways.

From March 1918 until the end of the war on 11 November 1918, hundreds of soldiers and engineers learned, how to construct and to operate a narrow-gauge railway. They trained to lay tracks, to build railway bridges and to operate the small steam and gasoline locomotives. Many narrow-gauge railways were used by American troops in the international war theater to transport supplies, ammunition and building materials as well as casualties and the wounded. Similar narrow gauge railways were located in Fort Benning, Georgia, Fort Sill, Oklahoma, Fort Benjamin Harrison, Indiana, and Fort Dix, New Jersey.

Around 1920, the narrow gauge railway tracks of Camp Humphreys were lifted and fell into oblivion. After the war, some of the locomotives and wagons of Camp Humphreys and other forts were not scrapped but re-used in mining operations and plantations around the world.

External links 
 39 photos on Flickr
 Photos on Picssr

References 

2 ft gauge railways in the United States
Railway lines in the United States
Military railways